Full Bluntal Nugity is a live album by the American hard rock guitarist Ted Nugent, recorded on New Year's Eve (12/31/2000) at Ted Nugent's annual Whiplash Bash in Detroit, MI. A live DVD with the same title was released in 2003 by Eagle Rock Entertainment.

CD Track listing
"KLSTRPHK" (instrumental) – 3:59  
"Paralyzed" – 4:27  
"Snakeskin Cowboys" – 5:58  
"Wang Dang Sweet Poontang" – 6:43  
"Free-for-All" – 4:10 
"Yank Me, Crank Me" – 2:43  
"Hey Baby" – 4:12  
"Fred Bear" (acoustic) – 8:11  
"Cat Scratch Fever" – 5:26 
"Stranglehold" – 9:47  
"Great White Buffalo" – 5:20 
"Motor City Madhouse" – 6:58

DVD Track Listing

Main Program
"Intro"
"Great Nuge Buffalo"*
"Paralyzed"
"Stormtroopin'"
"Nuzenoizcheck"**
"Snakeskin Cowboyz"
"Nuge Gear Abuse"**
"Free For All"
"Hey Baby"
"Nugeradio"**
"Wang, Dang, Sweet Poontang"
"Nuge Manager-Doug Banker and Supansa Wedding"**
"Kiss My Ass"
"Full Uzinage"**
"Yank Me, Crank Me"
"Spirit W/ Garlic, Butter & Gutpiles"**
"Dog Eat Dog"
"Cat Scratch Fever"
"Derek St. Holmes La Jam"**
"Stranglehold"
"Motor City Madhouse"
"Buffalo Entrance II"*
"Fred Bear"
"Outro/Credits"
"tednugent.com"

 = Ted on stage before song
 = Backstage footage

Bonus Features
Interactive Ted Nugent Commentary
"Journey To The Center Of The Mind" bonus 1967 performance
5 vintage performances of "Free For All", "Wang, Dang, Sweet Poontang", "Cat Scratch Fever", "Motor City Madhouse", and "Fred Bear" from various tours from 1978, 1980, and 2000
"Crave" music video
Ted Nugent Discography
tednugent.com video links

Personnel
Band members
 Ted Nugent – guitars, vocals, producer, mixing 
 Marco Mendoza – bass, backing vocals, lead vocals on "Hey Baby"
 Tommy Aldridge – drums, backing vocals (on live album)
 Tommy Clufetos – drums, backing vocals (on DVD)

Production
 Chris Peters – producer
 Drew Peters – producer, mixing
 Joel Singer – engineer
 Ben Began – mixing
 Joe Lambert – mastering
 Peter Tsakiris – art direction, design
 Rob Alford – photography
 Sherrie Buzby – photography, tray card
 Michael Wheeler – photo imaging

References

Ted Nugent albums
2000 live albums
2003 video albums
Live video albums
Spitfire Records live albums